The 2si 460 is a family of in-line twin-cylinder, two-stroke, single ignition, aircraft engines that were designed for ultralight aircraft.

The basic engine was originally designed and produced by ILO-Motorenwerke of Germany and was later acquired by the AMW Cuyuna Engine Company of Beaufort, South Carolina and marketed under the Cuyuna brand name. Later the engine was marketed by Cuyuna under the Two Stroke International (2si) brand. Cuyuna no longer markets engines for aircraft use, although the 460 is still in production as a Diesel/multifuel or gasoline industrial, marine and sport vehicle engine.

Development
The 460 is a conventional twin-cylinder engine that weighs  in its F35 aircraft version. The engine features single capacitor discharge ignition, piston porting, tuned exhaust system, one or two slide venturi-type carburetors, fuel pump, a cast iron cylinder liner, ball, needle and roller bearings throughout. The aircraft version was offered with cog belt drive or a gearbox reduction system. Starting is electric starter or recoil starter.

Variants
460-F35
Gasoline aircraft engine, single carburetor,  at 6000 rpm, weight  (discontinued).
460-F40
Gasoline aircraft engine, single carburetor,  at 6500 rpm, weight  (discontinued).
460-F45
Gasoline aircraft engine, dual carburetors,  at 6750 rpm, weight  (discontinued).
460 MF
Diesel/multi-fuel engine for marine and industrial applications,  at 6000 rpm, weight  without gearbox.
460F-35
Gasoline industrial engine and sport vehicle engine for auto racing, kart and All-terrain vehicle applications, single carburetor,  at 6000 rpm, basic weight .
460FE-35
Gasoline industrial engine and sport vehicle engine for auto racing, kart and ATV applications with electric start, single carburetor,  at 6000 rpm, basic weight .
460L-50
Gasoline marine engine powering a jet pump,  at 6750 rpm.

Applications

Specifications (460-F35 aircraft engine)

See also

References

Air-cooled aircraft piston engines
Two-stroke aircraft piston engines